Nampula is the capital city of Nampula Province in Northern Mozambique. With a population of 743,125 (2017 census), it is the third-largest city in Mozambique after Maputo and Matola. The city is located in the interior of Nampula Province, approximately 200 kilometers from the coast and is surrounded by plains and rocky outcrops. The city is a major regional centre for the entire Northern region of Mozambique, as well as parts of Central Mozambique and border areas of Malawi and Tanzania. 

The city links the port city of Nacala with land-locked Southern African countries, particularly Malawi through a road and railway line. The city has a small international airport connecting to Nairobi in Kenya, Johannesburg in South Africa, Dar-es-Salaam in Tanzania and is a hub for local transport in northern Mozambique. Nampula is the centre of business in Northern Mozambique, benefitting from highly productive agricultural areas, proximity to the Nacala Development Corridor, and a fast-growing city population. 

Nampula is home to the Mozambican National Ethnographic Museum, several markets, cathedrals, mosques, universities, training institutes and schools. The city is diverse, with the native eMakhuwa population being the largest group but with a visible Indian, European, Chinese, Lebanese, Somali, and Nigerian population.

Etymology 
The name "Nampula" is said to be derived to the eMakhuwa word "Whampula", which according to local legend refers to a tribal leader of the area in the past.

History 
Nampula is a relatively new city. It was founded by the Portuguese colonial army in 1907 and elevated to city status in 1956. During the Mozambican War of Independence, Nampula was a strategic military centre for the colonial army in the fight against the FRELIMO liberation movement.

After independence in 1975, the Portuguese abandoned Nampula and rural populations migrated to the city, squatting in unplanned areas on the city outskirts. This migratory movement dramatically increased during the Mozambican Civil War, affecting Nampula in the decade between 1982 and 1992. When the war ended the Mozambican Government expected the refugees to return to the countryside, but they remained in the city. After a few years of migratory slow‐down, the growth of the city resumed, as the rapid economic development of Mozambique materialized mostly in the urban areas. Nampula, in the post‐war period, developed into a major Mozambican growth centre, attracting an increasing number of public and private investments in a wide range of economic and social areas. 

In colonial times there was a Nampula Town Hall with a very limited mandate which was dissolved in 1979. The Municipal Council of Nampula was created in 1998, alongside those of other major Mozambican cities. FRELIMO won the first local elections that year, and in the subsequent elections in 2003, 2008, and 2011. An opposition party, the Democratic Movement of Mozambique (MDM), won the 2013 municipal elections, led by Mahamudo Amurane. Mayor Amurane was assassinated in October 2017, and investigations into his death proved to be inconclusive. Amurane's death led to a collapse of the MDM's support base in Nampula and another opposition party, RENAMO, won subsequent municipal elections led by Paulo Vahanle. 

Since the establishment of the city, Nampula has had numerous mayors:
 Aurélio das Neves
 Germano José Joaquim
 Francisco Joaquim de Lima
 Narciso João Iondela
 Ishaca Abdul Ali Baraca
 Dionísio Cherewa
 Castro Namuaca
 Mahamudo Amurane
 Paulo Vahanle

Administration 
Nampula is divided into seven administrative zones, which are also subdivided into localities, as follows: Urbano Central, Anchilo, Muatala, Muhala, Namikopo, Napipine, and Natikiri.

Population

Demographics

Religion 
Nampula's dominant religions are Christianity and Islam. A small community of Hindus are also present in the city. Its Cathedral of Our Lady of Fatima is the archiepiscopal see of the Roman Catholic Diocese of Nampula.

Education 
The city is home to the Faculty of Health Science, Universidade Lurio. In 2009 a course in optometry was launched, the first of its kind in Mozambique. The course was supported through the Mozambique Eyecare Project. The other partners include the Dublin Institute of Technology, University of Ulster and Brien Holden Vision Institute. As of 2019, 61 Mozambican students have graduated with optometry degrees from Universidade Lurio (34 male and 27 female). The optometry course is now fully embedded within Universidade Lurio's systems and continues to recruit new students every year. Importantly, optometry is now registered as a profession in Mozambique and is recognized through membership of the African Council of Optometry (AFCO). Of the graduates, 26 are now working in public hospitals. In addition, 10 have university teaching posts (five male and five female). Seven of the graduates have enrolled on postgraduate programmes (five male and seven female).

There is a Portuguese international school, Escola Lusófona de Nampula, as well as four international English schools, with the oldest being Stella Maris International School.

Transport 

 The city has an airport, Nampula International Airport, which is located 4 kilometres away from the city centre. Kenya Airways currently operates thrice-a-week flights from Nairobi, while Airlink connects to Johannesburg in South Africa. LAM connects to domestic places like Pemba, Lichinga, Tete, Beira, Vilankulo, Quelimane and Maputo.
 The Nacala railway serves the city. Additionally, a railway workshop is located in the city.
 The bus stand, which can be accessed from any part of the city within 10 minutes, connects with places within Nampula province and in the neighbouring provinces. The tourist location Ilha de Moçambique, is located 200 km east of Nampula and is accessible by numerous minibuses.

Geography 
The city of Nampula lies in the centre of the province of Nampula and is surrounded by plains and rocky outcrops. The city lies amongst rolling hills and mountains, typical of the interior of northern Mozambique.

Climate 
Nampula has a tropical savanna climate (Köppen climate classification: Aw).

Notable locals 
Abel Xavier, a Portuguese football player, Carlos Queiroz, a Portuguese football manager formerly in charge of Real Madrid, and football manager, Paulo Fonseca were also from Nampula, at that time a city of the Portuguese Overseas Province of Mozambique. 

Nazira Abdula, pediatrician and Mozambican Minister of Health, was born in Nampula. 

Rui Águas, Portuguese racing driver, was born in Nampula.

References 

 
Waystations
Populated places in Nampula Province
1956 establishments in Mozambique